Sunshine Noodles was a Cambodian American restaurant in Portland, Oregon.

Description 
Sunshine Noodles was a Cambodian American restaurant in the Slabtown area of northwest Portland's Northwest District. The interior, described by Brooke Jackson-Glidden of Eater Portland as "Hello Kitty-meets-Blade Runner", had neon lights and pink tiles. The menu, which changed often, included Phnom Penh noodles, a beef brisket noodle stew, fish sauce spaghetti and meatballs, and catfish spring rolls. The brunch menu included macaroni soup, steak with eggs and rice, strawberry French toast, and grits with shrimp and bacon jam. Cocktails included the Mekhong Vacation, a passion fruit margarita.

History 
Revelry chef Diane Lam launched Sunshine Noodles as a noodle bar pop-up with David Sigal in 2019. The menu included kuyteav Phnom Penh and num banhchok. The pop-up was successful, according to Jackson-Glidden of Eater Portland. Revelry planned to rebrand as Revelry Noodle Bar, but closed in 2020, during the COVID-19 pandemic.

Sunshine Noodles operated at north Portland's Psychic Bar from July 2020 to January 2021. The Cambodian menu included spelt noodles with French-style vegan tomato and maitake mushroom ragout with Maggi seasoning, as well as samlar machu, and grilled corn with coconut milk glaze. Sunshine Noodles also served potato chip salad with cabbage, wasabi ranch dressing, and candied cashews, and chile relleno banh chao. The pop-up was designed for social distancing during the pandemic.

Lam began hosting a series of dinner parties at the restaurant called Penh Pals. The pop-ups operation was expanded and extended through March 2021. Sunshine Noodle's fried chicken with lime sauce became "a breakout hit", according to Jackson-Glidden. Previously scheduled to operate longer, the pop-up ended service temporarily on December 24, 2020, intending to reopen at a permanent location in March 2021. The pop-up hosted a Valentine's Day dinner. In November 2021, Sunshine Noodles announced plans to re-open as a brick and mortar restaurant in Slabtown on December 13. The restaurant launched a brunch menu in 2022.

In December 2022, Lam announced plans to close Sunshine Noodles permanently on December 18 and relocate to San Francisco. Stacked Sandwich Shop is slated to reopen in the space in 2023, alongside a second location of Feel Good.

Reception 
In August 2020, Willamette Week said of the pop-up at Psychic Bar, "Sunshine Noodles is an avowedly irreverent, none too serious take on contemporary Cambodian food ... The corn pudding is a candidate for the city's best new dessert, but the lime pepper wings are the breakout hit—spicy and complex, they want for nothing except a beer, and perhaps a napkin." The newspaper also included Sunshine Noodles in a list of "Five Great New Restaurants That Opened in 2020".

Katherine Chew Hamilton of Portland Monthly also included the Sunshine Noodles in an overview of best new restaurants of 2020. For the magazine's "2020 Portland Food Highlight Reel", she wrote: "We also loved the patio at contemporary Cambodian spot Sunshine Noodles, one of the first restaurants in Portland that was specifically designed with pandemic safety considerations in mind, with Dance Dance Revolution-themed arrows directing foot traffic and cartoon noodle bowls serving as social distance markers." In 2022, she included the fish sauce spaghetti and meatballs in a list of "4 Noodle Dishes to Eat Now", and the Le Quick Fix in the magazine's list of "The Best Local Spots to Sip Espresso Martinis Like a '90s Boss".

References

External links 

 
 

2019 establishments in Oregon
2022 disestablishments in Oregon
Cambodian restaurants
Cambodian-American culture
Defunct Asian restaurants in Portland, Oregon
Northwest District, Portland, Oregon
Restaurants disestablished in 2022
Restaurants established in 2019